Beyond the Blue Horizon is a 1971 studio album by American jazz guitarist George Benson. It was his first album released by CTI and included organist Clarence Palmer, drummer Jack DeJohnette, bassist Ron Carter, and percussionists Michael Cameron and Albert Nicholson.

Background 
This album followed The Other Side of Abbey Road, his last album for A&M, arranged by Don Sebesky with brass, strings, and 23 musicians. Contrary to that Benson recovered at his first CTI release a classical format from a small group that included a Hammond B-3 organ, a type of ensemble in which Benson had a lot of experience recording as a sideman with organist "Brother" Jack McDuff up to 11 albums between 1963 and 1965. This was also the kind of group on The New Boss Guitar of George Benson, his debut album as a leader in 1964 recorded with the organ quartet of Jack MacDuff.

In an interview by Anthony Brown and Ken Kimery in April 2011, Benson said this album was recorded at the beginning of CTI Records as an independent label. Producer Creed Taylor had to borrow money to make it and because "he didn't have no money to put any sweetening on it, no strings or anything like that" it was more of a challenge. "I thought, I'll just get some great cats, pick some great tunes, and play some great guitar and this is exactly what he did. I borrowed Miles Davis's drummer Jack DeJohnette and brought Ron Carter aboard, so I thought it would be appropriate to honor Miles with a funky cover of 'So What', his classic modal tune from Kind of Blue. We also experimented with some Middle Eastern vibes, some bossa nova, and some good old bebop."

Reception and critics 
In the 7th edition of the Penguin Guide to Jazz on CD, critics Richard Cook and Brian Morton wrote Beyond the Blue Horizon  "still has the right to be one of Benson's best records". At AllMusic  Richard S. Ginell stated "this is a superb jazz session". "The Jazz Messenger" called it "probably the single best document of Benson's technically fluid facility and his musically inventive lyricism at any tempo."

Music and compositions 
The performance of Miles Davis's "So What" is driven by the rhythm section of bassist Ron Carter and drummer Jack DeJohnette, who provide strong support for solos by Benson and organist Clarence Palmer, according to Dan Bilawsky in All About Jazz as "constantly shifts from funk to up-tempo swing to a half-time feel".

Album design 
The cover of the LP from 1971 was designed by Bob Ciano with photos by Pete Turner. "Flames" was shot in 1964 in Libya as part of a series Turner made for Standard Oil. The picture of Benson in black and white was taken by Chuck Stewart.

Track listing 

Bonus tracks on CD reissue in 1987:

Personnel 
 George Benson – guitar
 Clarence Palmer – Hammond organ
 Ron Carter – double bass, electric cello
 Jack DeJohnette – drums
 Michael Cameron – percussion
 Albert Nicholson – percussion

Technical
 Rudy Van Gelder – engineering
Bob Ciano – album design
 Chuck Stewart – photography
 Pete Turner – photography

References 

1971 albums
George Benson albums
Albums produced by Creed Taylor
CTI Records albums
Albums recorded at Van Gelder Studio